Cutler Heights is a locality between Bowling and Laisterdyke in Bradford, West Yorkshire, England.  It is known for its many industrial estates, among them engineering and steel trading businesses.

References

Areas of Bradford